Sarah Ellis may refer to:

Sarah Stickney Ellis (1799–1872), English writer
Sarah Ellis (author) (born 1952), Canadian children's writer
Sarah Kate Ellis (born 1971), American media executive